The 1994 Iowa gubernatorial election took place November 8, 1994. Incumbent Republican Governor of Iowa Terry Branstad ran for re-election to a fourth term as governor. Branstad narrowly defeated a tough challenger in his primary election, emerging victorious by fewer than 12,000 votes. On the Democratic side, Attorney General of Iowa Bonnie Campbell won her party's nomination and both Branstad and Campbell moved on to the general election. Branstad ultimately won re-election to a fourth term as governor, defeating Campbell by a comfortable margin.

Democratic primary

Candidates
Bonnie Campbell, Attorney General of Iowa
Bill Reichardt, former Iowa State Senator and former Green Bay Packers football player

Results

Republican primary

Candidates
Terry Branstad, incumbent Governor of Iowa
Fred Grandy, U.S. Representative from Iowa's 5th congressional district

Results

General election
Governor Terry Branstad made reinstatement of the death penalty a central focus of his 1994 re-election campaign; however, despite successfully being re-elected, he was unable to implement this policy due to opposition from Democrats in the Iowa State Senate.

Polling

Results

See also
United States gubernatorial elections, 1994
State of Iowa
Governors of Iowa

References

1994
Iowa
Gubernatorial